Itaro Santos (born 28 July 1985) is a German-born Brazilian former professional snooker player. Itaro is based at the Legends Snooker Academy in Leytonstone, England, United Kingdom.

Career
Since 2004 Santos has also competed for Germany, as his native Brazil was not then a member of the IBSF. He is a two-time German Amateur Championship and together with Lasse Münstermann and Sascha Lippe competed as part of Team Germany at the European Team Snooker Championship of 2007. Through a wildcard Santos has also competed in the finals of the World Series of Snooker 2008/09. However he only managed to finish third in his group and failed to qualify for the next round.

Santos won the 2015 Pan American Championship to earn a two-year card for the snooker tour beginning with the 2015–16 season. He only played four matches in the 2015/2016 season, losing all of them. Santos also lost all 12 of his matches in the 2016–17 season, though he was 3–1 ahead of world number six Shaun Murphy at the UK Championship, but was beaten 6–3. He has now dropped off the tour.

Performance and rankings timeline

Tournament wins

Amateur

References

External links
 Itaro Santos at CueTracker.net: Snooker Results and Statistic Database

1985 births
Living people
Brazilian snooker players
German snooker players
Sportspeople from Recife